Bargan (also Romanized as Bargān; also known as Barkān) is a village in Bakhtajerd Rural District, in the Central District of Darab County, Fars Province, Iran. At the 2006 census, its population was 1,132, in 259 families.

References 

Populated places in Darab County